The Ferrari 488 GTE is a grand tourer racing car built by Ferrari's in-house Competizioni GT unit, for competition in endurance racing. It is a replacement for the Ferrari 458 GT2 racing car, using the Ferrari 488 as a base. The car is built in accordance with the Automobile Club de l'Ouest/FIA LM GTE regulations introduced for the 2016 season, and it currently competes in the IMSA WeatherTech SportsCar Championship, FIA World Endurance Championship, and the European Le Mans Series. The car had its race debut at the 2016 24 Hours of Daytona, with the Scuderia Corsa and Risi Competizione teams.

Development

Ferrari 488 GTE 

Following the launch of the Ferrari 488, a Ferrari spokesperson confirmed that a racing version of the car would be unveiled soon. On 30 August 2015, spy photographs taken at the ACI Vallelunga Circuit showed tests of a highly camouflaged car undergoing testing, with major differences compared to the outgoing 458 GT2. The car was launched at the 2015 Finali Mondiali at the Mugello Circuit, alongside its GT3 counterpart. At the launch, few details of the car were shared, with the engine carrying over from the 488 GTB being the main announcement. The car can shift between LM GTE, and Group GT3 specification.

Ferrari 488 GTE Evo 

On 13 November 2017, Ferrari Competizioni GT technical coordinator Ferdinando Cannizzo confirmed that both the 488 GTE and GT3 would be receiving Evo kits, aimed at improving reliability, as well as aero performance optimization. The 488 GTE Evo had its shakedown test at Ferrari's Fiorano Circuit on 30 March 2018. Following a wind tunnel test at the WindShear facility, the 488 GTE Evo had its front dive-planes removed. Cannizzo suggested that the car could remain in competition until 2021 with a second Evolution, instead of Ferrari developing a new car.

Competition History

2016 FIA World Endurance Championship

World Endurance Cup for GT Manufacturers

FIA Endurance Trophy for LM GTE Pro Teams

2016 IMSA WeatherTech Sportscar Championship

GT Le Mans Teams Championship

GT Le Mans Manufacturers Championship

2017 FIA World Endurance Championship

GT World Endurance Manufacturers' Championship

Endurance Trophy for LMGTE Pro Teams

Endurance Trophy for LMGTE Am Teams

2017 IMSA WeatherTech Sportscar Championship

GT Le Mans Manufacturers' Trophy

2017 European Le Mans Series

LMGTE Teams Championship

* - Points scored by the Ferrari 458 Italia GT2.

2018 IMSA WeatherTech Sportscar Championship

GT Le Mans Teams Championship

GT Le Mans Manufacturers Championship

2018-19 FIA World Endurance Championship

World Endurance GTE Manufacturers' Championship

2019 IMSA WeatherTech Sportscar Championship

GT Le Mans Teams Championship

GT Le Mans Manufacturers Championship

External links

References 

LM GTE cars
24 Hours of Le Mans race cars
488 GTE